Tribasodites setosiventris is a species of beetles first found in Guizhou, China.

References

Staphylinidae
Beetles described in 2015
Insects of China